Ceallasaigh Beag (or Keallasay Beg) is a low-lying island in Loch Maddy off North Uist in the Outer Hebrides of Scotland. This an area of shallow lagoons filled and drained by the tides each day. Ceallasaigh Mòr lies to the south and these two islets are connected by a narrow strip of sand during some low tides.

The area is c.  as measured from Ordnance Survey maps at high tide.

Neither Ceallasaigh Mòr nor Ceallasaigh Beag are listed by Hamish Haswell-Smith in his definitive listings of islands greater in size than  suggesting that he measured both of them as <40 ha, or that he considered them to be tidal and connected to mainland North Uist. It is possible that at some stages of the tide that these two islands are connected to one another and that Ceallasaigh Mòr is joined to North Uist near Bràigh Cheallasaigh.

See also
Other complex islands in the vicinity:
 Eileanan Iasgaich
 Eileanan Chearabhaigh

Footnotes

References
 

Uist islands